Acleris keiferi is a species of moth of the family Tortricidae. It is found in North America, where it has been recorded from California and Idaho.

Adults have been recorded on wing from May to October.

The larvae feed on Rosa californica, Rubus ursinus and Fragaria species.

References

Moths described in 1964
keiferi
Moths of North America